Marchubeh (also Romanized as Mārchūbeh) is a village in Barzavand Rural District, in the Central District of Ardestan County, Isfahan Province, Iran. At the 2006 census, its population was 155, in 45 families.

References 

Populated places in Ardestan County